"Rescue Me" is a song by American band OneRepublic, released as the lead single from their fifth studio album Human through Interscope Records and Mosley Music Group on May 17, 2019.

Promotion
The band announced the single on May 14, sharing a clip of a boy looking at a large waterfall before "eerie" music plays as the release date is shown.

Music video
The music video shows a young boy, the protagonist, being chased by a group of bullies older than him. When he seems to have no escape, he begins to dance and discovers that he has powers, which he will use to overcome them.

It was directed by Christian Lamb and choreographed by Sherri Silver and was shot in Silverton, Oregon. It features Cody Bingham from Dancing with the Stars: Juniors as the young boy.

The music video was released on May 17, 2019, and currently has almost 140 million views (December 2022).

Charts

Weekly charts

Year-end charts

Certifications

Release history

References

2019 singles
2019 songs
OneRepublic songs
Songs written by Ryan Tedder
Songs written by Brent Kutzle
Song recordings produced by Ryan Tedder
Mosley Music Group singles
Interscope Records singles